The prime minister of Kuwait is the head of government of Kuwait. The officeholder is unelected and is appointed by the Emir of Kuwait as per Article 56 of the Kuwait constitution. As the third most powerful official in the country, following the Emir of Kuwait and Speaker of the National Assembly, the prime minister leads the executive branch of the Government of Kuwait. 

Abdullah Al-Salim Al-Sabah, the Emir of Kuwait during the period of Kuwait's independence, appointed himself the first Prime Minister of Kuwait on 17 January 1962, after the Constituent Assembly was elected to draft the Constitution.

Until 2003, the Crown Prince of Kuwait was usually appointed to the office of prime minister.

List of officeholders (1962–present)
Source:

See also

Kuwait National Guard
Ministry of Foreign Affairs (Kuwait)
Ministry of Defense (Kuwait)
Ministry of Interior (Kuwait)
Politics of Kuwait

Notes

References

 
Prime Ministers
Kuwait, List of Prime Ministers of